Charles Augustus Miller (June 28, 1850 – July 12, 1917) was an American businessman, newsworker, and politician from Harrisburg, Pennsylvania who served as a Pennsylvania State Representative, Harrisburg City Councilman, and Mayor of Harrisburg.

Biography
Raised in Harrisburg, Miller attended the Harrisburg Academy and went on to graduate from St. Charles Borromeo College in 1871 with Honors. Miller entered public service in 1880, elected as a city councilman while working as a printer. Elected president of the council in 1882, he also worked for the Harrisburg Telegraph as a foreman in the composing room from 1881 to 1885. 

In 1885, he resigned after being elected to the Pennsylvania House of Representatives as a member of the Republican ticket for the city district. Following his term as a representative, he was reelected to the city council in 1888, became an early supporter of the City Beautiful Movement, and was regarded as an expert on municipal law. 

In 1915, Miller was elected to be the first president of the Harrisburg Councilman Association. 

Following the death of Mayor Ezra S. Meals, Miller was unanimously elected as mayor by the city council on May 15, 1917, fulfilling his lifelong ambition to serve as the city's chief executive.

Death
After a long complication of diseases, he died on July 12, 1917.

References

1850 births
1917 deaths
Mayors of Harrisburg, Pennsylvania
Members of the Pennsylvania House of Representatives
19th-century American politicians
20th-century American politicians
Pennsylvania city council members